Mahendragiri, is a mountain in Rayagada block of the district of Gajapati, Odisha, India. It is situated amongst the Eastern Ghats at an elevation of .It is second  biodiversity Heritage Site of Odisha. This is considered as one out of Seven Kula Parvat of India.

Geography
This is the second highest mountain peak of Odisha after Deomali in Koraput district. It has interesting archaeological remains.

Mahendragiri hill and its surrounding areas are recognized as a biodiversity hot spot due to numerous medicinal plants and other species that are found here. A haven for medicinal plants, Mahendragiri Hills, which is part of the Eastern Ghats, is home to over 600 flowering plants. The faunal diversity of the region is huge and particularly known for being a herpetofauna hotspot.

The Ministry of Environment and Forests, GoI had proposed the State Government of Odisha in 1986 to declare the Mahendragiri hill as a Biodiversity Hotspot area. An expert committee of the Forest and Environment Department has also recommended that the bio-diversity hotspot Mahendragiri Hills should be declared as a Biosphere Reserve in 2014.

The Mahendragiri Biosphere Reserve Committee, which was constituted in November, 2011, held its last meeting in December last after which it submitted its final report recommending that a Biosphere Reserve in Mahendragiri Hill Complex should be created.

As per the survey carried out by Odisha Space Application Centre, the core area could be spread over 42.54 km2 while the buffer zone will have an area of 1577.02 km2. The transitional area is estimated at 3095.76 km2. The entire biosphere reserve, proposed at 4715.32 km2 area.

History 
Mahendragiri is associated with the Ramayana as Mahendra Parvata (mountain). It is a 'Kula Parvata' along with Malaya, Sahyadri, Parijatra, Shuktiman, Vindhya and Malyavaan. In the Puranas and Ramayana It is said that Parashurama was meditating on Mahendragiri when Lord Rama broke the sacred bow of Shiva.

Mahendragiri is situated in Gajapati district, Odisha. Legend says that it is the place where Lord Parashurama, a chiranjeevi stays eternally and performs tapasya. Parashurama is the sixth avatar of Vishnu in Hinduism and he is one of the Chiranjeevis (long - lived), who will appear at the end of the Kali yuga to be the guru of Vishnu's tenth and last avatar, Kalki. He carried a number of traits, which included aggression, warfare and valor; also, serenity, prudence and patience. He retired in the Mahendra Mountains, according to chapter 2.3.47 of the Bhagavata Purana. He is the only Vishnu avatar who never dies, never returns to abstract Vishnu and lives in meditative retirement. Further, he is the only Vishnu avatar that co-exists with other Vishnu avatars Rama and Krishna in some versions of the Ramayana and Mahabharata respectively. Temples, which are said to be built by the Pandavas are present. The main festival observed here is Shivaratri.

References

Bibliography 
 

Eastern Ghats
Mountains of Odisha
Ancient Indian mountains
Mahabharata